Jiang Zhipeng (born 6 March 1989) is a Chinese footballer who currently plays for Shenzhen in the Chinese Super League.

Club career
Jiang Zhipeng started his football career when he joined the Genbao Football Academy in 2000 and was promoted to Shanghai East Asia's first team in the 2006 season. On 10 December 2010, Jiang transferred to top tier side Nanchang Hengyuan along with Wang Jiayu for a total fee of ¥6 million. He scored his first goal for the club on 24 September 2011 in a 5-2 loss against Shandong Luneng. Jiang made 28 league appearances in the 2011 season which secured Nanchang's stay in the top tier for the 2012 season. He followed the club when the club decided to move to Shanghai in 2012 and they rebranded themselves as Shanghai Shenxin.

On 29 January 2014, Jiang transferred to fellow Chinese Super League side Guangzhou R&F. He made his debut for the club in a league game on 9 March 2014 in a 1-1 draw against Tianjin Teda. By the end of the 2014 season, he had established himself as a vital member within the team and helped guide Guangzhou R&F to their highest ever position of third within the league and qualification for the AFC Champions League for the first time in the club's history.

On 22 February 2018, Jiang transferred to fellow top tier side Hebei China Fortune. He would make his debut in a league game against Tianjin TEDA F.C. on 3 March 2020 in a 1-1 draw. After two seasons with the club he would join another top tier club in Shenzhen on 16 July 2020. He would go on to make his debut against Guangzhou R&F F.C. in a league game on 26 July 2020 in a 3-0 victory.

International career
Jiang made his debut for the Chinese national team on 6 June 2013  in a 2-1 loss against Uzbekistan. Then manager Alain Perrin decided to call him up for the 2015 AFC Asian Cup where Jiang played in all of China's games as they were knocked out in the quarterfinals by Australia.

Personal life
On 29 March 2017, after Jiang messed up a headed clearance in a 2018 FIFA World Cup qualification match that gifted Iran the decisive goal in a 1-0 loss, Jiang's ex-wife Zhang Zhiyue claimed that Jiang had an extramarital affair for nearly three-and-a-half-years out of their four-year marriage. Jiang made a statement on 30 March 2017 that their divorce was due to alienation of mutual affection instead of an extramarital affair.

Career statistics

Club statistics
.

International statistics

Honours

Club
Shanghai East Asia
China League Two: 2007

Individual
Chinese Super League Team of the Year: 2016, 2017

References

External links
 
 

1989 births
Living people
Chinese footballers
Footballers from Qingdao
Shanghai Port F.C. players
Shanghai Shenxin F.C. players
Guangzhou City F.C. players
Hebei F.C. players
Shenzhen F.C. players
Association football midfielders
China international footballers
2015 AFC Asian Cup players
Chinese Super League players
China League One players
China League Two players